The 1992 Kyrgyzstan League was the 1st season of Kyrgyzstan League, after independence from the Soviet Union, the Football Federation of Kyrgyz Republic's top division of association football. Alga Bishkek were the inaugural champions. Twelve teams participated in the inaugural season.

After the season, Ala Too Naryn, who finished in 12th place and Namys APK Talas, who finished in 9th place, were removed from the league. They were replaced by Ysy Kol Karakol, Shumkar SKIF Bishkek, Han Tengri Kant,
Shakhtyor Task Kumyr, Maksat Belovodskoye, and Uchkun Kara Suu. 
The leading goal scorer for the season was Igor Sergeyev. He scored 26 goals for SKA Dostuk Sokuluk.

League standings

Top scorers

References

Kyrgyzstan

Kyrgyzstan League seasons
1
Kyrgyzstan
Kyrgyzstan